The Tazewell & Peoria Railroad (T&P)  (November 1, 2004—Present) is a short-line railroad, running entirely in Peoria County and Tazewell County, Illinois, and formed by Genesee & Wyoming Inc. to lease the assets of the century-old Peoria and Pekin Union Railway (P&PU), which is owned by Union Pacific, Norfolk Southern and Canadian National.  It switches close to 100,000 cars per year and has about 142 miles of track.

The P&PU track straddles the Illinois River at Peoria, Illinois, making the T&P an important transportation link for industrial sites such as the Caterpillar plant in East Peoria, Illinois.  In addition to interconnections with the P&PU track's owners, the T&P interconnects with the Burlington Northern Santa Fe, the Toledo, Peoria & Western, the Iowa Interstate Railroad, and the T&P's sister Illinois and Midland Railroad.

Locomotive roster

See also
 Peoria and Pekin Union Railway for pre-2005 history of this rail
 Genesee and Wyoming Railroad — owner of TZPR
 Illinois and Midland Railroad — adjacent rail owned by GWRR

References

External links

 Tazewell & Peoria Railroad — Genesee & Wyoming Inc. official site, with map and information

Railway companies established in 2004
Illinois railroads
Transportation in Peoria County, Illinois
Transportation in Tazewell County, Illinois
Switching and terminal railroads
Genesee & Wyoming